Iniistius is a genus of wrasses native to the Indian and Pacific Oceans.

Species
The 21 currently recognized species in this genus are:
 Iniistius aneitensis (Günther, 1862) (yellowblotch razorfish)
 Iniistius auropunctatus J. E. Randall, Earle & D. R. Robertson, 2002
 Iniistius baldwini (D. S. Jordan & Evermann, 1903) (Baldwin's razorfish)
 Iniistius bimaculatus (Rüppell, 1829) (two-spot razorfish)
 Iniistius brevipinnis J. E. Randall, 2013
 Iniistius celebicus (Bleeker, 1856) (Celebes razorfish)
 Iniistius cyanifrons (Valenciennes, 1840)
 Iniistius dea (Temminck & Schlegel, 1845) (blackspot razorfish)
 Iniistius evides (D. S. Jordan & R. E. Richardson, 1909)
 Iniistius geisha (Araga & Yoshino, 1986)
 Iniistius griffithsi J. E. Randall, 2007 (Griffiths' razorfish)
 Iniistius jacksonensis (E. P. Ramsay, 1881) (purple-spotted wrasse)
 Iniistius melanopus (Bleeker, 1857) (yellowpatch razorfish)
 Iniistius naevus G. R. Allen & Erdmann, 2012 (blemished razorfish)
 Iniistius pavo (Valenciennes, 1840) (peacock wrasse)
 Iniistius pentadactylus (Linnaeus, 1758) (fivefinger wrasse)
 Iniistius spilonotus (Bleeker, 1857)
 Iniistius trivittatus (J. E. Randall & Cornish, 2000)
 Iniistius twistii (Bleeker, 1856) (redblotch razorfish)(Japanese flag fish)
 Iniistius umbrilatus (O. P. Jenkins, 1901) (razor wrasse)
 Iniistius verrens (D. S. Jordan & Evermann, 1902)

References

 
Labridae
Marine fish genera
Taxa named by Theodore Gill